Gerald Allan Sohl Sr. (December 2, 1913 – November 4, 2002) was an American television scriptwriter and science fiction author who wrote for The Twilight Zone (as a ghostwriter for Charles Beaumont), Alfred Hitchcock Presents, The Outer Limits, Star Trek: The Original Series (once using the pseudonym "Nathan Butler"), and other shows. He wrote more than twenty novels as well as feature film scripts. He also wrote the nonfiction works Underhanded Chess and Underhanded Bridge in 1973.

Novels
New York Times reviewer Villiers Gerson described his 1953 novel The Transcendent Man as "contain[ing] enough twists to afford the reader a few hours' entertainment" despite being "oversimplified in motivation." P. Schuyler Miller found the plot unconvincing. Gerson later panned Sohl's The Altered Ego, saying "This wordy book lacks characterization, emotion, suspense, and interest."

His 1955 Point Ultimate is a piece of Cold War invasion literature: in 1999, a faraway future history at the time of writing, the US lies under a cruel Soviet occupation, reinforced by a deadly artificial disease which makes conquered Americans dependent on the conquerors for the injections that keep them alive.

In The Time Dissolver (1957), a man and a woman wake one morning to find that they have lost all memory of the past eleven years, including how they met and become married.

Ghostwriting

As Charles Beaumont became increasingly ill from a mysterious brain illness, possibly Pick's disease or very early onset Alzheimer's, and unable to write, Sohl ghostwrote three episodes of The Twilight Zone for him.  These were "The New Exhibit", "Queen of the Nile" and "Living Doll".  Beaumont insisted on splitting the fees for each episode.

Bibliography

Novels

The Haploids (1952)
The Transcendent Man (1953) 
Costigan's Needle (1953)
The Altered Ego (1954)
Point Ultimate (1955)
The Mars Monopoly (1956)
The Time Dissolver (1957)
Prelude to Peril (1957)
One Against Herculum (1959)
The Odious Ones (1959)
Night Slaves (1965)
The Lemon Eaters (1967)
The Anomaly (1971)
The Spun Sugar Hole (1971)
Dr. Josh (1973) (as by Nathan Butler)
The Resurrection of Frank Borchard (1973)
Mamelle (1974) (as by Nathan Butler)
SuperManChu, Master of Kung Fu (1974) (as by Sean Mei Sullivan)
Blow-Dry (1976) (as by Nathan Butler)
I, Aleppo (1976)
Mamelle, The Goddess (1977) (as by Nathan Butler)
Death Sleep (1983)
Kaheesh (1983) (as by Nathan Butler)
Night Wind (1983) (as by Roberta Jean Mountjoy)
Black Thunder (1983) (as by Roberta Jean Mountjoy)

Non-fiction

Underhanded Chess (1973)
Underhanded Bridge (1973)

Filmography

Films

Television

References

External links
 Obituary on The Independent website
 

 
 
 

20th-century American novelists
American male novelists
American science fiction writers
1913 births
2002 deaths
American male short story writers
American male screenwriters
American male television writers
20th-century American short story writers
20th-century American male writers
20th-century American screenwriters